Erwin Louis Hahn (June 9, 1921 – September 20, 2016) was an American physicist, best known for his work on nuclear magnetic resonance (NMR). In 1950 he discovered the spin echo.

Education
He grew up in  Sewickley, Pennsylvania. He received his B.S. in Physics from Juniata College and his M.S. and Doctor of Philosophy from the University of Illinois at Urbana–Champaign. He served as an enlisted sailor in the United States Navy and was an instructor on radar and sonar.

Career and research
He was professor of physics, from 1955 to 1991, and subsequently, Professor Emeritus at the University of California, Berkeley. Hahn was elected a Fellow of the American Academy of Arts and Sciences in 1971. In 1993 he was awarded the Comstock Prize in Physics from the National Academy of Sciences. In 2013, Sir Peter Mansfield said in his autobiography that Hahn was "the person who really missed out" the Nobel Prize for his contribution to the principles of spin echoes. He also received the 2016 Gold Medal from the International Society for Magnetic Resonance in Medicine (ISMRM). The award, ISMRM's highest honor, was given to Hahn for his creation of pulsed magnetic resonance and processes of signal refocusing which are essential to modern day MRI. He died at the age of 95 in 2016.

See also

References

External links

 Oral History interview transcript with Erwin L. Hahn on 21 August 1986, American Institute of Physics, Niels Bohr Library and Archives
 Alexander Pines and Dmitry Budker, "Erwin L. Hahn", Biographical Memoirs of the National Academy of Sciences (2019)
 The Transformative Genius of Erwin Hahn - Interview published 8 May 2016, Magnetic Resonance in Medicine Highlights.  
 Download the entire Highlights print supplement featuring this story at: http://www.ismrm.org/MRM/mrm_highlights_magazine.pdf

1921 births
2016 deaths
Juniata College alumni
American physicists
American nuclear physicists
Fellows of the American Academy of Arts and Sciences
Foreign Members of the Royal Society
Members of the United States National Academy of Sciences
Members of the French Academy of Sciences
Oliver E. Buckley Condensed Matter Prize winners
People from Sharon, Pennsylvania
Stanford University faculty
University of California, Berkeley College of Letters and Science faculty
University of Illinois Urbana-Champaign alumni
Wolf Prize in Physics laureates
United States Navy sailors